Rufus Segar (28 August 1932 – 7 May 2015) was a British anarchist, illustrator, and graphic designer best known for his designs of Anarchy magazine throughout the 1960s.

Segar was born in Ipswich, Suffolk, England and attended Rhyl Grammar School and St Asaph Grammar School. While studying at Liverpool College of Art Segar became involved with the Liverpool Anarchist Group. Upon graduating in 1953 Segar moved to London and began working in advertising for Horatio Myer & Co. Ltd, then SH Benson.

In 1955 he was imprisoned for three months for refusing to perform national service. For 30 years, Segar worked as an illustrator and graphic designer for the Economist Intelligence Unit in London. He also worked freelance illustrating books.

From 1961 to 1970 Segar designed and illustrated the monthly Anarchy magazine, edited by Colin Ward and published by Freedom Press. Ward gave Segar significant freedom in his design of each issue, though working to a tight deadline. Segar ceased designing Anarchy shortly after Ward ceased being editor.

Segar retired to Saltwood in Kent, followed by Pershore in Worcestershire, though he continued illustrating books. He died on 7 May 2015 at the age of 82.

References

Further reading

External Links 

 Anarchy magazine archive

British anarchists
Artists from Ipswich
1932 births
2015 deaths
British illustrators
British graphic designers
British conscientious objectors
Alumni of Liverpool College of Art